is a professional wrestling stable, currently performing in the Japanese professional wrestling promotion, World Wonder Ring Stardom. Founded by Giulia, the stable also consists of Maika, Himeka, Thekla and Mai Sakurai. The stable is often known by Giulia's catchphrase arrivederci ("goodbye" in Italian), which is a reference to her Italian background.

History

Under Giulia's leadership (2020–present)

After her first moments in Stardom and after being accused of not having any friends, Giulia would tease the formation of a stable. On January 14, 2020, Maika lost a Future of Stardom Championship match against the champion Utami Hayashishita at one of the Professional Wrestling Just Tap Out promotion JTO Hatsu house shows at Korakuen Hall. After the match, Giulia recruited her as the second member of the stable, Donna del Mondo. At Stardom's 9th Anniversary show on January 19, Syuri returned to the company and joined the stable, teaming with Giulia and Maika in a six-woman tag team match to defeat Tokyo Cyber Squad's Death Yama-san, Hana Kimura and Leyla Hirsch. On February 8, Giulia teamed up with Syuri and Maika to defeat Queen's Quest (AZM, Momo Watanabe and Utami Hayashishita) for the Artist of Stardom Championship. On March 24, Giulia defeated Jungle Kyona in the first round, Momo Watanabe in the quarter-final, fellow stablemate Syuri in the semi final, and Natsuko Tora in the final to be crowned the 2020 Cinderella Tournament winner. On the June 21 show at Shin-Kiba 1st Ring, Himeka made her Stardom debut as a mystery member for Giulia, Syuri and Maika, with whom she later defeated the team of Stars (Mayu Iwatani, Tam Nakano, Starlight Kid and Saya Iida). At Stardom Cinderella Summer In Tokyo on July 26, Maika fell short to Momo Watanabe, Syuri and Himeka defeated Mayu Iwatani and Saya Iida, and Giulia defeated Tam Nakano to win the Wonder of Stardom Championship vacated by a retiring Arisa Hoshiki. On October 3, at Stardom Yokohama Cinderella 2020, Natsumi Maki debuted under the name Natsupoi, following her departure from Tokyo Joshi Pro Wrestling and defeated Death Yama-san as a mystery opponent. She was revealed to have joined the stable as the newest member. On November 14, at Korakuen New Landscape, the team of Giulia, Syuri and Maika were defeated by Oedo Tai (Bea Priestley, Natsuko Tora and Saki Kashima) for the Artist of Stardom Championship, ending their reign at 280 days. At Stardom Sendai Cinderella 2020 on November 15, Maika defeated Saya Iida to retain the Future of Stardom Championship, Himeka fell short to Momo Watanabe, Syuri defeated Bea Priestley to win the SWA World Championship, and Giulia retained the Wonder of Stardom Championship against Konami.

Four of the stable members participated in the 2020 edition of the Goddesses of Stardom Tag League under two different sub-groups created only for the tournament: Giulia and Maika as Crazy Bloom and Syuri and Himeka as Grab The Top. Giulia and Maika fell short to Queen's Quest's sub-group Momoaz portrayed by AZM and Momo Watanabe in the finals of the tournament which took place on November 8, 2020. At Stardom Osaka Dream Cinderella 2020 on December 20, Maika dropped the Future of Stardom Championship to Saya Iida in a three-way match also involving Saya Kamitani.

2021
On February 14, 2021, at Stardom Go To Budokan! Valentine Special - Day 2, Himeka and Maika defeated Oedo Tai (Bea Priestley and Konami) to win the Goddess of Stardom Championship. Natsupoi defeated AZM to win the High Speed Championship at Stardom All Star Dream Cinderella on March 3, 2021, where all the  members of the stable were holding titles only for a brief period until Giulia lost her Wonder of Stardom Championship to Tam Nakano in a hair vs hair match  the same night, after which she got her hair shaved. At Stardom Yokohama Dream Cinderella 2021 on April 4, 2021, Himeka and Maika lost the Goddess of Stardom Championship to fellow members Giulia and Syuri after an intern stable clash. On the first night of the Stardom Cinderella Tournament 2021 from April 10, all of the stable members participated in Cinderella Tournament first-round matches, beginning with Himeka who defeated Hanan, Maika who defeated Konami, Giulia picking a victory over Ruaka and Syuri defeating fellow member Natsupoi. On the second night which took place on May 14, Natsupoi defeated Lady C, Tam Nakano and Hanan in a four-way match, Syuri defeated Utami Hayashishita in the Cinderella Tournament second-round matches but fell short to Unagi Sayaka in the quarter-finals. On the same night Maika defeated Giulia, and Himeka picked up a win over Mayu Iwatani, both securing their places in the semi-finals. On the third night from June 12, Utami Hayashishita successfully defended the World of Stardom Championship against Syuri due to going against her in two matches, one of them ending up in a thirty-minute time limit draw which restarted. The second match ended with both Hayashishita and Syuri falling to a ten-count. At Yokohama Dream Cinderella 2021 in Summer on July 4, Maika teamed up with Lady C and fell short into a Gauntlet tag team match, and Giulia and Syuri successfully defended their Goddess of Stardom Championship against Stars (Mayu Iwatani and Koguma). For the Stardom 5 Star Grand Prix 2021, all the members of the unit were listed as participants in the tournament. Syuri defeated Momo Watanabe in the finals of the event from September 25, 2021 to win the trophy. At Stardom in Nagoya from October 3, Maika, Natsupoi and Himeka tramed up as the "MaiHimePoi" trio to dethrone Cosmic Angels' Tam Nakano, Mina Shirakawa and Unagi Sayaka by taking the Artist of Stardom Championship away from them. At Stardom 10th Anniversary Grand Final Osaka Dream Cinderella on October 9, 2021, Syuri successfully defended the SWA World Championship and her World of Stardom Championship challenge rights certificate by defeating Saki Kashima who replaced an unclear to compete Konami, and Maika, Himeka and Natsupoi successfully defended the Artist of Stardom Championship against Momo Watanabe, AZM and Saya Kamitani. At Kawasaki Super Wars, the first event of the Stardom Super Wars trilogy which took place on November 3, 2021, Himeka and Natsupoi wrestled Mayu Iwatani and Koguma in a time-limit draw, Maika battled Mina Shirakawa and Saya Kamitani in a three-way match and Syuri successfully defended her SWA World Championship and the World of Stardom Championship challenge rights certificate successfully against AZM. At Osaka Super Wars on December 18, 2021, MaiHimePoi won a six-woman ¥10 Million Unit Tournament also disputed for the Artist of Stardom Championship by defeating Marvelous (Takumi Iroha, Rin Kadokura and Maria) in the semi-finals and Mayu Iwatani, Hazuki and Koguma in the finals, scoring two consecutive defenses for the titles and winning the money prize. At Stardom Dream Queendom on December 29, Maika, Natsupoi and Himeka successfully defended the Artist of Stardom Championship against Mina Shirakawa, Unagi Sayaka and Mai Sakurai of Cosmic Angels, Giulia made her in-ring return and defeated Konami who announced a planned hiatus from professional wrestling, and in the main event, Syuri defeated Utami Hayashishita to win the World of Stardom Championship, ending the latter's reign at 409 days.

2022

At Stardom Award in Shinjuku on January 3, 2022, Giulia revealed Thekla from Ice Ribbon and Mirai from Tokyo Joshi Pro Wrestling as the two masked superstars who kept attacking various other wrestlers. All three of them teamed up to defeat Tam Nakano, Unagi Sayaka and Mai Sakurai in a six-woman tag team match. At Stardom in Korakuen Hall on January 9, 2022, Syuri and Giulia dropped the Goddess of Stardom Championship to FWC (Hazuki and Koguma) after the latter team earned their contendership by winning the 2021 edition of the Goddesses of Stardom Tag League. At Stardom Nagoya Supreme Fight on January 29, 2022, Thekla defeated Mina Shirakawa to win the vacant SWA World Championship, Maika and Himeka unsuccessfully challenged Hazuki and Koguma for the Goddess of Stardom Championship], Giulia battled Mayu Iwatani into a time-limit draw in a number one contendership match for the World of Stardom Championship which solded with an opportunity for both of them at Stardom World Climax, and Syuri successfully defended the World of Stardom Championship against stablemate Mirai. At Stardom in Osaka on February 12, 2022, Giulia teamed up with Thekla and Mirai to defeat Cosmic Angels (Tam Nakano, Unagi Sayaka and Mai Sakurai) in a six-woman tag team match. After months of Giulia asking Sakurai if she wants to be stronger, Sakurai told Cosmic Angels' unit leader Nakano “I don’t want to dance, I want to wrestle” and joined Donna Del Mondo. At Stardom Cinderella Journey on February 23, 2022, Mai Sakurai defeated Waka Tsukiyama and Rina in a three-way match to become the number one contender for the Future of Stardom Championship, Syuri, Maika and Himeka went into a 20-minute time-limit draw against fellow stablemates Giulia, Thekla and Mirai, and Natsupoi unsuccessfully challenged Saya kamitani for the Wonder of Stardom Championship. At Stardom New Blood 1 on March 11, 2022, Mai Sakurai and Mirai teamed up to wrestle Saya Kamitani and Lady C into a time-limit draw. On March 21, 2022, at Stardom in Nagoya, after they defeated Mayu Iwatani and Saya Iida, the feud between Syuri and Giulia degenerated into their "AliKaba" team disbanding, and with Syuri announcing that she wants her own path so she would hire herself a bodyguard. On the first night of the Stardom World Climax 2022, Mirai defeated a returning Saya Iida in a singles match via submission, Himeka, Natsupoi, and Mai Sakurai won a six-woman tag team gauntlet match, Maika and Thekla fell short to Prominence's Suzu Suzuki and Risa Sera, and in the main event, Syuri successfully defended the World of Stardom Championship against Giulia, and then confirmed that she will leave Donna Del Mondo to walk on her own path and would tease the formation of a new stable, with a mysterious girl helping her out of the arena being the first announced member. Syuri was the first member to leave the stable. On the second night from March 27, Mai Sakurai unsuccessfully challenged Hanan for the Future of Stardom Championship, Mirai fell short to Utami Hayashishita in a singles match, and Giulia, Maika, Himeka and Thekla took out Prominence's Risa Sera, Suzu Suzuki, Akane Fujita and Mochi Miyagi with whom all the Donna Del Mondo members have been in a feud. However, Suzu Suzuki stated that she was not finished with Giulia despite her unit's loss, hinting that the feud was still standing. On the first night of the Stardom Cinderella Tournament 2022 from April 3, in the first round matches, Himeka defeated Ruaka, Giulia defeated Thekla, Mai Sakurai defeated Lady C, Mirai defeated Mina Shirakawa, Natsupoi defeated Starlight Kid, and Maika went into a double over the top rope elimination against Saya Kamitani in the second rounds. Maika challenged Kamitani to a Wonder of Stardom Championship match at Stardom Golden Week Fight Tour on May 5, 2022 which the latter accepted. In the main event of the evening, Syuri defeated her new unit member Ami Sourei in the first rounds and named the unit as "God's Eye". Surprisingly, Mirai showed up, announcing her resignation from Donna Del Mondo and joining God's Eye. Giulia, Himeka, Natsupoi and Mai Sakurai eventually fell short to Syuri, Mirai, Ami Sourei and a returning Konami on May 5. At Stardom Flashing Champions on May 28, 2022, Thekla unsuccessfully challenged AZM for the High Speed Championship, Giulia and Mai Sakurai unsuccessfully challenged Hazuki and Koguma for the Goddess of Stardom Championship and Maika, Himeka and Natsupoi dropped the Artist of Stardom Championship to Oedo Tai's Saki Kashima, Momo Watanabe and Starlight Kid. At Stardom Fight in the Top on June 26, 2022, Himeka picked up a victory over Mina Shirakawa, and Giulia, Maika and Mai Sakurai unsuccessfully challenged Oedo Tai's Starlight Kid, Momo Watanabe and Saki Kashima, and God's Eye's (Syuri, Ami Sourei and Mirai) for the Artist of Stardom Championship. At Stardom New Blood 3 on July 8, 2022, Mai Sakurai defeated Yuuri, and Giulia defeated Miyu Amasaki in the main event. At Mid Summer Champions in Tokyo, the first event of the Stardom Mid Summer Champions which took place on July 9, 2022, Giulia, Maika, Himeka, Natsupoi and Mai Sakurai challenged Tam Nakano, Unagi Sayaka, Mina Shirakawa, Saki and Hikari Shimizu in an elimination tag team match. Natsupoi betrayed Donna Del Mondo by attacking Giulia mid-match, attracting Donna Del Mondo's loss. Natsupoi subsequently joined Cosmic Angels in the process. At Stardom in Showcase vol.1 on July 23, 2022, Maika and Himeka defeated Saya Iida and Ami Sourei, and Giulia and Mai Sakurai fell short to Prominence's Suzu Suzuki and Risa Sera in a hardcore match. At Mid Summer Champions in Tokyo, the first event of the Stardom Mid Summer Champions which took place on July 9, 2022, Giulia, Maika, Himeka, Natsupoi and Mai Sakurai fell short against Tam Nakano, Unagi Sayaka, Mina Shirakawa, Saki and Hikari Shimizu in an elimmination match. At Mid Summer Champions in Nagoya from July 24, 2022, Mai Sakurai teamed up with Rina Amikura, falling short to Hanan and Saya Iida, and Giulia, Himeka and Maika unsuccessfully challenged Momo Watanabe, Saki Kashima and Starlight Kid for the Artist of Stardom Championship. At Stardom x Stardom: Nagoya Midsummer Encounter on August 21, 2022, Maika defeated Hina, Giulia and Mai Sakurai competed in a three-way match won by Ami Sourei and Mirai and also involvong Ruaka and Rina, and Himeka unsuccessfully challenged Saya Kamitani for the Wonder of Stardom Championship. At Stardom New Blood 4 on August 26, 2022, Mai Sakurai teamed up with Linda to defeat Saya Iida and Momo Kohgo. At Stardom in Showcase vol.2 on September 25, 2022, Maika fell short to AZM, Mayu Iwatani and Ram Kaicho in a Falls Count Anywhere Four-Way Match, and Giulia teamed up with Rina Yamashita to defeat Momo Watanabe and Ruaka in a Hardcore Rules Tag Team Match. At Stardom New Blood 5 on October 19, 2022, Mai Sakurai defeated Chanyota. At Hiroshima Goddess Festival on November 3, 2022, Himeka defeated Yuna Mizumori, Thekla, Giulia and Mai Sakurai went into a time limit draw against Ami Sourei, Mirai and Konami and Maika unsuccessfully challenged Syuri for the World of Stardom Championship. At Stardom Gold Rush on November 19, 2022, Giulia, Thekla and Mai Sakurai made it to the finals of a "Moneyball tournament" where they fell short to Mayu Iwatani, Hazuki and Koguma, and Maika and Himeka defeated 7Upp (Nanae Takahashi and Yuu in the Goddess Tag League. At Stardom in Showcase vol.3 on November 26, 2022, Himeka participated in a four-way match won by Lady C and also involving Saya Kamitani and Momo Kohgo, Maika teamed up with Mayu Iwatani and Hanan to defeat Utami Hayashishita, Mirai and Hina ikn a judo rules match, and Giulia, Thekla and Mai Sakurai fell short to Neo Stardom Army's Nanae Takahashi, Yuu and a mysterious "reaper mask" as a result of a casket match in which Rossy Ogawa was also a victim. At Stardom Dream Queendom 2 on December 29, 2022, Thekla and Mai Sakurai fell short to Unagi Sayaka and Mina Shirakawa, Maika and Himeka defeated Ami Sourei and Mirai, and Ruaka and Natsuko Tora to earn a future chance to the Goddess of Stardom Championship and Giulia defeated Syuri to win the World of Stardom Championship.

2023
At Stardom New Blood 7 on January 20, 2023, Mai Sakurai teamed up with Chanyota and defeated Momo Kohgo and Momoka Hanazono in the quarterfinals of the inaugural New Blood Tag Team Championship tournament. At Stardom Supreme Fight 2023 on February 4, 2023, Thekla and Mai Sakurai competed in a call your shot match for any championship of choice, Maika and Himeka unsuccessfully challenged 7Upp (Nanae Takahashi and Yuu) for the Goddess of Stardom Championship, and Giulia successfully defended the World of Stardom Championship against Suzu Suzuki.

Independent circuit (2020-present)

Various members of the unit are known for their sporadic appearances outside of Stardom. Syuri competed the most in many other promotions as she was still a freelancer shortly after joining the stable. She made an appearance at Seadlinnng's 5th Anniversary on January 24, 2020, where she teamed up with Tsukasa Fujimoto and Hiroyo Matsumoto, picking up a victory against MAX VOLTAGE (Miyuki Takase, Nanae Takahashi and Ryo Mizunami). Syuri also worked for Oz Academy in several matches, one of them taking place at OZ Academy Poker Face on March 3, 2020 where she unsuccessfully challenged Maya Yukihi and Tsubasa Kuragaki in a three-way match. On March 8, Syuri unsuccessfully challenged Chihiro Hashimoto at Sendai Girls Don't Forget That Day for the Sendai Girls World Championship. On September 20, 2020, Syuri competed against Risa Sera for the FantastICE Championship in a no-ropes lumberjack match at Ice Ribbon New Ice Ribbon #1071, an event promoted by the Ice Ribbon promotion.

At Hana Kimura Memorial Show, an event promoted by Kyoko Kimura which portraited one year from the death of her daughter Hana, Syuri and Natsupoi teamed up with Mio Momono and Asuka to defeat the returning Kagetsu and HZK who portraited the Oedo Tai and Konami and Death Yama-san who portraited Tokyo Cyber Squad in an Eight-woman tag team match.

New Japan Pro Wrestling (2021-present)
On January 5, 2021, in the second night of Wrestle Kingdom 15, Giulia teamed up with fellow stable member Syuri to defeat Mayu Iwatani and Tam Nakano in an exhibition match. On the same night, Maika, Himeka and Natsupoi competed in another exhibition match in a losing effort to Queen's Quest's (AZM, Saya Kamitani and Utami Hayashishita). On the first night of the Wrestle Grand Slam in MetLife Dome from September 4, Maika teamed up with Lady C in a losing effort to Momo Watanabe and Saya Kamitani. Giulia and Syuri were also announced to compete on the second night against the latter team which they defeated. At Historic X-Over on November 20, 2022, Thekla, Mai Sakurai and Himeka fell short to AZM, Lady C and Saya Kamitani, and Maika teamed up with Hirooki Goto and fell short to Utami Hayashishita and Hiroshi Tanahashi in a mixed tag team match, and Giulia teamed up with Zack Sabre Jr. to defeat Syuri and Tom Lawlor in another mixed match.

Members

Current

Former

Sub-groups

Current

Former

Timeline

Championships and accomplishments
Other titles
BS Japan Queen Of The Ring Championship (1 time) – Syuri
 Pro Wrestling Illustrated
Singles wrestlers
 Ranked Syuri No. 7 of the top 150 female singles wrestlers in the PWI Women's 150 in 2021
 Ranked Giulia No. 16 of the top 150 female singles wrestlers in the PWI Women's 150 in 2021
 Ranked Maika No. 46 of the top 150 female singles wrestlers in the PWI Women's 150 in 2021
 Ranked Natsupoi No. 70 of the top 150 female singles wrestlers in the PWI Women's 150 in 2021
 Ranked Thekla No. 69 of the top 150 female wrestlers in the PWI Women's 150 in 2022
Tag team wrestlers
 Ranked Giulia and Syuri No. 5 of the top 50 tag teams in the PWI Tag Team's 50 in 2021
 Tokyo Sports
 Women's Wrestling Grand Prize (2020) – Giulia
 Weekly Pro-Wrestling
 Women's Professional Wrestling Grand Prix (2020) – Giulia
World Wonder Ring Stardom
World of Stardom Championship (2 times, current) – Syuri (1) Giulia (1, current)
Wonder of Stardom Championship (1 time) – Giulia
Goddess of Stardom Championship (2 times) – Himeka and Maika (1) and Giulia and Syuri (1)
Artist of Stardom Championship (2 times) – Giulia, Maika and Syuri (1) and Maika, Natsupoi and Himeka (1)
SWA World Championship (2 times) – Syuri and Thekla
Future of Stardom Championship (1 time) – Maika
High Speed Championship (1 time) – Natsupoi
5★Star GP 
(2021) – Syuri
(2022) – Giulia
Stardom Cinderella Tournament
 (2020) – Giulia
 5★Star GP Award (6 times)
 5★Star GP Best Match Award (2020) – 
 5★Star GP Best Match Award (2020) – 
 5★Star GP Fighting Spirit Award (2020) – 
 5★Star GP Best Match Award (Red Stars) (2021) – 
 5★Star GP Best Match Award (Blue Stars) (2021) – 
 5★Star GP Best Match Award (Red Stars) (2022) – 
 Stardom Year-End Award (6 times)
 Best Unit Award (2020) – 
 MVP Award (2020) – Giulia
 Shining Award (2020) – Giulia
 Match of the Year
(2021) – Giulia vs. Tam Nakano
(2022) – Giulia vs. Syuri (2022)
 Outstanding Performance (2021) – Syuri

Luchas de Apuestas record

Notes

See also
Neo Stardom Army
Cosmic Angels
Queen's Quest
God's Eye
Oedo Tai
Stars

References

External links 

 

Independent promotions teams and stables
Japanese promotions teams and stables
Women's wrestling teams and stables
World Wonder Ring Stardom teams and stables